Penicillium radicum is an anamorph species of the genus of Penicillium which was isolated from rhizosphere of Australian wheat. This species has the ability to solubilise inorganic phosphates, this can promote plant growth Penicillium radicum produces rugulosin

References

Further reading 
 
 
 
 

radicum
Fungi described in 1998